Canarium paniculatum is a species of flowering plant in the family Burseraceae. It is endemic to Mauritius.

References

Endemic flora of Mauritius
paniculatum
Endangered plants
Taxonomy articles created by Polbot